Archips nigricaudanus is a species of moth of the family Tortricidae. It is found in China (Liaoning), Korea, Japan and Russia (Ussuri, Sakhalin, Siberia).

The wingspan is 16–22 mm for males and 22–23 mm for females. Adults are on wing from April to June in China.

The larvae feed on Diospyros, Malus, Morus, Pyrus and Quercus.

References

Moths described in 1900
Archips
Moths of Asia